Super Hero is a song recorded by South Korean idol group VIXX. It was released physically and as a digital single on May 24, 2012 through Jellyfish Entertainment. The song served as VIXX's debut single and single album. "Super Hero" was written and composed by Lee Ki Won aka Kiggen, the leader of hip-hop trio Phantom. VIXX's rapper, Ravi also participated in the song's creation by writing the rap for "Super Hero".

The song's music video was directed by Hong Won-ki of Zanybros.

Composition
VIXX's debut track, "Super Hero", was composed by rapper Kiggen (Phantom), guitarist Brent Paschke and prolific music producer Drew Ryan Scott.

Promotions
The group started promoting on May 24 and they had their debut stage on Mnet's M! Countdown. They ended promotion for the album performing a remix of "Super Hero" in their goodbye stages from July 1 to July 13.

Music video

The MV for "Super Hero" was directed by veteran director Hong Won-ki of Zanybros.

Track listing
The credits are adapted from the official homepage of the group.

Credits and personnel
VIXX - vocals
Cha Hakyeon (N) - Lead vocals, background vocals
Jung Taekwoon (Leo) - Main vocals, background vocals
Lee Jaehwan (Ken) - Main vocals, background vocals
Kim Wonsik (Ravi) - rap, songwriting
Lee Hongbin - vocals
Han Sanghyuk (Hyuk) - vocals
Kiggen - songwriting, producer, music
Brent Paschke - producer, music
Jimmy Richard Drew - producer, music

Chart performance

Release history

References

External links
 Super Hero - Single on iTunes

VIXX songs
2012 songs
Korean-language songs
Jellyfish Entertainment singles